Amish country may refer to:

 Ohio Amish Country, in Holmes County, Ohio, the highest concentration of Amish in the world; see Amish in Ohio
 Pennsylvania Dutch Country, the largest population of Amish in the United States
 Illinois Amish Country, along Illinois Route 133
 Northern Indiana Amish Country, in Elkhart and LaGrange Counties
 Amish settlements in other areas; see